Partclone is a partition clone and restore tool. It provides utilities to back up and restore partitions and is designed for higher compatibility of the file system library. It is developed by the NCHC Free Software Labs in Taiwan. It is the default backup application in Clonezilla, FOG from version 1.00 and Redo Backup and Recovery which is simply a front end to partclone. It supports many file systems and has good performance, as it skips portions of the file system marked as free space.

Utilities 
Partclone currently supports the following filesystems:
ext2, ext3, ext4, hfs+, reiserfs, reiser4, btrfs, vmfs(v3, v5), xfs, jfs, ufs, ntfs, fat(12/16/32), and exFAT.
To run partclone for a particular filesystem, one uses the command 'partclone.<fstype>', in a similar manner to the mkfs command

 partclone.btrfs
 partclone.ext2, partclone.ext3, partclone.ext4
 partclone.fat32, partclone.fat12, partclone.fat16
 partclone.ntfs
 partclone.exFAT
 partclone.hfsp
 partclone.jfs
 partclone.reiserfs
 partclone.reiser4
 partclone.ufs (support SU+J)
 partclone.vmfs (v3)
 partclone.vmfs5 (for vmfs v5)
 partclone.xfs

Features 
Partclone is a partition image tool which attempts to only back up used data blocks. It's written in C and focuses on cloning filesystems, as opposed to cloning disks. The basic features are:
 clone partition to image file
 restore image file to partition
 restore image file to raw file as loop device
 duplicate partition on the fly
 create domain file for ddrescue
 crc32 support
 pipe support (restore from stdin | clone to stdout)
 text mode | quiet mode
 Ncurses Text interface
 rescue support
 transfer rate, elapsed time calculating
 support raw clone (like dd)
 partclone.chkimg check image made by partclone

See also 

List of disk cloning software
Partimage
Clonezilla
FSArchiver
FOG Project

References

External links
 

Disk images
Free backup software
Backup software